The Men's pole vault event  at the 2011 European Athletics Indoor Championships was held at March 4–5, 2011 with the final being held on March 5 at 15:45 local time.

Records

Results

Qualification

Qualification: Qualification Performance 5.75 (Q) or at least 8 best performers advanced to the final. It was held at 16:15.

Final
The final was held at 15:45.

References

Pole vault at the European Athletics Indoor Championships
2011 European Athletics Indoor Championships